Le Vingtième siècle. La vie électrique (1890) is a science fiction novel written by the French author Albert Robida. It aims to describe various aspects of life in France in 1955. Robida weaves the scientific work and technological advances made by the illustrious French scientist Philox Lorris into his plot.  A great emphasis is put on how the new technology has transformed the French society and individual lives of people. The novel is written in a lively tone and contains many comic situations. The original French edition included multiple illustrations drawn by the author which are executed in a satirical style reflecting Robida's other occupation as a caricaturist.

Background
La Vie électrique by Albert Robida, translated as Electric Life, was serialized in La Science Illustrée from 28 November 1891 to 30 July 1892 and published in book form by La Librairie Illustrée in 1892. It was advertised as a continuation of the Vingtième siècle sequence which had begun with Le Vingtième siècle, and was presumably commissioned by Louis Figuier, the editor of La Science illustrée for the roman scientifique section of the magazine with that specific brief. The author subsequently added a fourth long story to the series in the novella Un Potache en 1950 as an afterthought which added little that was new to the image of life in the mid-twentieth century and was milder in its satire. Of the three major elements of the series, La Vie électrique is most savagely critical of the way the world appeared to the author to be going, at least partially, and even when it eventually settles more contentedly into blatant and unrepentant farce, it retains a trenchant black edge. However, given that so many of its sarcastic anticipations have actually been realized, it may have seemed more farcical in 1892 than it does now. Robida was only extrapolating visible trends in constructing his image of the future, but he probably assumed that he was extrapolating them to absurd extremes. On the other hand, modern readers can see that he did not go as far as he might have done in certain instances.

When Robida began writing the novel in 1891, the phonograph was only fourteen years old and the cylinders employed by early manufacturers had yet to be replaced by the flat disks employed when the machine mutated into the gramophone. The telephone had been patented only a year before the phonograph, and it too was still in its infancy in 1891. Although patents for electric light bulbs had been granted previously, it was not until the 1880s that Joseph Swan and Thomas Edison developed commercially viable products. Radio waves had only recently been detected in 1886, and the notion of wireless telegraphy was still a fanciful one, the idea of “broadcasting” even more so. Robida was by no means the only writer to anticipate a glorious future for electric lighting, domestic power supplies, phonographs and telephones—even telephones augmented with visual apparatus — but no one else writing in the nineteenth century took the combination of those devices to the extreme that he did in imagining a future where most communication would take place electrically by means of what he calls “la plaque du télé”, or the Tele screen, which would also serve as significant inputs of home entertainment, relaying music and theatrical performances.

Other nineteenth-century writers also anticipated the rapid and enormously expansive development of technology in association with big business and envisaged drastic changes to the pace of everyday life in consequence, but no one else envisaged a state of affairs in which almost everyone might be in a perpetual state of fatigue and nervous stimulation, overstressed to the point of debility and illness. Again, Robida was not alone in suggesting that improved technologies of communication might increase friction between nations, thus increasing the likelihood of armed conflict—and the commercial opportunities thus created for arms dealers—especially in combination with dramatic increases in population facilitated by technology, but he was unusual in depicting such matters as routine aspects of everyday life, virtually taken for granted.

Even in 1892, French speculative fiction abounded with caricatures of scientific geniuses whose turns of mind were very different from those of everyone else, especially with regard to the sentimental side of life. Robida's Philox Lorris is not at all unworldly in matters of business and is a relentlessly efficient opportunist, well aware of the power of advertising and the necessity of having friends in parliament; in that sense, he is not merely a symbol of science, but of the close alliance of science with what is nowadays known as the military-industrial complex: the real driving force of technological development and diehard enemy of what may be considered moral progress. Of course, there are aspects of La Vie Électrique that appear erroneous in retrospect if the novel is mistakenly construed as prophecy.

The most significant specific element of non-resemblance is the fact that virtually all traffic in Robida's twentieth century is air traffic, and most of that consists of dirigible airships (of course, the development of heavier-than-air flight was still more than a decade away in 1892.) That assumption leads to corollary architectural fancies with regard to the construction of the houses of the future and technologies of traffic control. If one leaves aside the focus on airships, what is being suggested—radically, at the time—is that in the twentieth century, large numbers of people will have their own private vehicles, and that houses, public buildings and the environment in general will have to undergo sweeping changes in order to accommodate those vehicles. La Vie électrique no longer qualifies as a work of futuristic fiction and cannot really qualify even as an exercise in alternative history, but it can and does qualify as a “steampunk” fantasy.

Plot summary
An electric storm raging in France as a result of the breakdown at one of the electric stations accidentally puts in contact George Lorris and Estelle Lacombe who meet each other via the téléphonoscope. George, a lieutenant of the French army in the corps of chemical engineers, is the only son of the great scientist and inventor Philox Lorris. Estelle belongs to a middle class family. George is planning to marry Estelle, a plan which encounters opposition from his father. The latter wants to marry George to either La Doctoresse Bardoz or La Senatrice Coupard, de la Sarthe, either of which is a woman of great accomplishments. George insists on his original intention, and when he and his bride embark on a pre-nuptial journey, Philox Lorris employs his colleague Sulfatin to break the relationship of the couple. Instead of the tour over the factories and scientific laboratories suggested by Philox Lorris and intended to fatigue the young pair, George takes Estelle and Sulfatin to a quiet village whose inhabitants resist modern technology and live in the traditions of the 19th century.

Sulfatin takes along on a journey his ward and patient, an invalid Adrien La Héronnière who is suffering from the exhaustion of the body due to an intensive mental work during his lifetime. Despite the instructions of Philox Lorris, Sulfatin does not meddle in the relationship of George and Estelle, apparently trying to make his boss disinherit George. This would make Sulfatin the sole successor of the great scientist. Philox Lorris seeing the failure of his plans, engages George in military maneuvers where George excels and advances in esteem of his bride even further. When George returns from his trip, more than ever convinced in the rightness of his decision to marry Estelle, his father becomes furious. Still, Philox Lorris believes he can alter the choice of his son.

Philox Lorris is working on his two novel scientific applications: a biological weapon and a vaccine that is meant to give boost to one's health. To promote these achievements and lobby them on a political level, he organizes a large party at his house to which he invites various dignitaries, including Arsène de Marettes, a prominent political figure. George is asked to collect the video-recordings of the greatest singers and performers of the past and play them for the audience. Unfortunately, as the party begins and the videos are played out, the sound quality turns out to be mediocre. The voices recorded on the tapes sound as if their owners caught a cold. This is due to Sulfatin's absent-mindedness: he took the tapes out to a chilly air last night. Due to this unforeseen circumstance, the video concert is going to be stopped in the middle. However, Estelle had taken the copies of the tapes for her personal enjoyment, and since the copies have not been affected by the cold air, she is able to replace the originals with them after which the concert continues with great success.

Meanwhile, Philox Lorris explains his inventions to politicians. Sulfatin who is assisting him with the demonstrations, confuses the health vaccine with the biological weapon and lets some of the latter escape into the room where the guests are gathered. Panic ensues; and many people including Philox Lorris and Sulfatin are poisoned. Luckily, the weapon is not lethal, and only incapacitates the affected. The house of Philox Lorris is transformed into a hospital where the guests (named the martyrs of the science in newspapers) occupy sick-beds. Philox Lorris and Sulfatin quarrel, but soon notice that Adrien La Héronnière recently cured by Sulfatin by the vaccine is immune to the poison.

Philox Lorris has an idea: he tries the vaccine on himself and in two days recovers completely. He repeats the application of the vaccine on the rest of the sick and achieves the desired effect. This makes a phenomenal advertisement of the vaccine which is immediately accepted as panacea on a national level. George marries Estella, and Philox Lorris has to save his face before La Doctoresse Bardoz and La Senatrice Coupard, de la Sarthe having previously offered the hand of George to both. He escapes the looming lawsuits by managing to marry La Senatrice Coupard, de la Sarthe to Sulfatin and La Doctoresse Bardoz to Adrien La Héronnière.

Technological devices
The technological devices mentioned in Le Vingtième siècle. La vie électrique and non-existent in 1890 include:
 Les tubes - a form of transportation operating above the city and reminiscent of modern rapid transit
 Le phonographe - a device through which two people can talk at a distance and reminiscent of a telephone
 Le téléphonoscope - a device that has the form of a large ovoid screen that is capable of transmitting visual information. In the novel it combines the capabilities of the modern TV, VCR and webcam.
 Hélicoptère, aéronef - vehicles that serve for individual transportation and can move through the air
 Sous-marine - a military watercraft reminiscent of a modern submarine

Social phenomena
Among the social phenomena predicted in the novel are:
 The emancipation of women and the creation of feminine political parties
 Biological warfare, praised as a humane alternative to a traditional military combat. The idea that the biological weapons will kill the weak and only temporarily incapacitate the healthy (thus selecting the people who are more fit for the propagation of the human race) borders on fascism
 The importance of scientific education and increasing complexity of scientific knowledge
 The debilitating effect that an intensive mental labor can have on humans
 The invasion of Chinese forces on Europe in 1941 (la grande invasion chinoise)
 The harmful consequences of science going out of control: for example, the electric storm created by the malfunction at one of the electric stations and the leakage of the biological weapons

Recent editions

 Elibron Classics series, 2006.  (paperback)
 Elibron Classics series, 2006.  (hardback)

References

1890 French novels
French science fiction novels
1890 science fiction novels
Works by Albert Robida
Fiction set in 1955